Guttigera rhythmica is a moth of the family Gracillariidae. It is known from Papua New Guinea.

References

Phyllocnistinae